Level Valley is a distinctive ice-free valley which descends northeastward from the Pivot Peak cirque, in the Wilkniss Mountains of Victoria Land, Antarctica. The name does not refer to the local topography, but is one of a group of names in the area associated with surveying applied in 1993 by the New Zealand Geographic Board, a surveyors "level" being an instrument designed primarily to furnish a horizontal line of sight.

References

Valleys of Victoria Land
Scott Coast